Odvan Gomes da Silva (born 26 March 1974) is a Brazilian former footballer who played as a defender.

Career
Born in Campos dos Goytacazes, Odvan played for Americano, Mineiros, Mimosense, Vasco da Gama, Santos, Botafogo, Coritiba, Fluminense, D.C. United, Náutico, Estrela da Amadora, Madureira, Bangu, Rio Bananal, Ituano, Cabofriense, União de Rondonópolis, CTAZ, São João da Barra, Goytacaz and ADR São José.

He earned 12 caps for the Brazilian national team, with whom he won the 1999 Copa América.

References

1974 births
Living people
People from Campos dos Goytacazes
Brazilian footballers
Americano Futebol Clube players
Mineiros Esporte Clube players
CR Vasco da Gama players
Santos FC players
Botafogo de Futebol e Regatas players
Coritiba Foot Ball Club players
Fluminense FC players
D.C. United players
Clube Náutico Capibaribe players
C.F. Estrela da Amadora players
Madureira Esporte Clube players
Bangu Atlético Clube players
Rio Bananal Futebol Clube players
Ituano FC players
Associação Desportiva Cabofriense players
União Esporte Clube players
Esporte Clube São João da Barra players
Goytacaz Futebol Clube players
Association football defenders
1999 Copa América players
1999 FIFA Confederations Cup players
Copa América-winning players
Brazilian expatriate footballers
Brazilian expatriates in the United States
Expatriate soccer players in the United States
Brazilian expatriates in Portugal
Expatriate footballers in Portugal
Brazil international footballers
Sportspeople from Rio de Janeiro (state)